Learning & Memory is a monthly peer-reviewed scientific journal covering the neurobiology of learning and memory. It was established in 1994 and is published by Cold Spring Harbor Laboratory Press. The editor-in-chief is John H. Byrne (University of Texas Health Science Center at Houston).

Abstracting and indexing 
The journal is abstracted and indexed in the Science Citation Index, Current Contents/Life Sciences, The Zoological Record, BIOSIS Previews, PsycINFO, Scopus, and Index Medicus/MEDLINE/PubMed. According to the Journal Citation Reports, the journal has a 2012 impact factor of 4.057.

References

External links 
 

Neuroscience journals
Monthly journals
Cold Spring Harbor Laboratory Press academic journals
English-language journals
Publications established in 1994